The Iowa State Fair Straw Poll is an informal poll for presidential and Iowa congressional candidates. The poll has been conducted by the Iowa Secretary of State with results posted to their website. It was begun in 2015 after the Republican Party of Iowa announced it would no longer hold its official Iowa Straw Poll given that a majority of presidential candidates declined to participate.

2015 Results 

In 2015, the State Fair poll found Donald Trump to be the most favored GOP candidate among 677 votes cast, defeating Ben Carson and Sen. Ted Cruz (Texas). Cruz went on to win the Iowa GOP caucuses, defeating Trump by 4 percent. On the Democratic side, out of a little more than 1,000 votes total, Hillary Clinton was the most popular Democrat defeating Bernie Sanders 49 percent to 45 percent. Clinton went on to defeat Sanders in the Democratic state primary by less than 1 percent.

Democratic 
Source of results: Iowa Secretary of State

Republican 
Source of results: Iowa Secretary of State

2019 Results  

In 2019, the State Fair saw a record-setting attendance of just under 1.2 million people over the course of its 11-day run. The Straw Poll result was published on August 19, 2019. On the Republican side, in total 1,976 votes were cast for 2 candidates. On the Democratic side, there were 24 candidates listed in the presidential poll and 2,118 votes cast. Iowa Secretary of State Paul Pate said, this Straw Poll has historically been a "pretty good" indicator for the outcome of "the race", despite it being only the second time the straw poll had been conducted.

Democratic

Republican

Notes

References

2015 establishments in Iowa
Des Moines, Iowa
Recurring events established in 2015
United States presidential straw polls